"Rice paper" has many varieties such as rice paper made from tree bark to make drawing and writing paper or from rice flour and tapioca flour and then mixed with salt and water to produce a thin rice cake and dried to become harder and paper-like. It is used to wrap many ingredients when eating. Vietnam is the only country that creates edible rice paper from the process of making rice noodles and pho noodles.
Rice paper is a product constructed of paper-like materials made from different plants. These include:
Thin peeled dried pith of Tetrapanax papyrifer: A sheet-like "paper" material was used extensively in late 19th century Guangdong, China as a common support medium for gouache paintings sold to Western clients of the era. The term was first defined in the Chinese–English Dictionary of Robert Morrison who referred to the use of the Chinese medicinal plant as material for painting, as well as for making artificial flowers and shoe soles.
Xuan paper made from paper mulberry: The traditional paper which originated in ancient China and it has been used for centuries in China, Japan, Korea, and Vietnam for writing, artwork, and architecture.
Various pulp-based papers: May be made from the rice straw or other plants, such as hemp and bamboo.
Dried starch sheets of various thickness or texture: These edible paper sheets have some properties of pulp paper and can be made from rice starch. They are known as bánh tráng, used in Vietnamese cuisine.

Rice paper plant
In Europe, around the 1900s, a paperlike substance was originally known as rice paper, due to the mistaken notion that it is made from rice. In fact, it consists of the pith of a small tree, Tetrapanax papyrifer, the rice paper plant (蓪草).

The plant grows in the swampy forests of Taiwan, and is also cultivated as an ornamental plant for its large, exotic leaves. In order to produce the paper, the boughs are boiled and freed from bark. The cylindrical core of pith is rolled on a hard flat surface against a knife, by which it is cut into thin sheets of a fine ivory-like texture.

Dyed in various colours, this rice paper is extensively used for the preparation of artificial flowers, while the white sheets are employed for watercolor drawings. Due to its texture, this paper is not suited for writing.

Mulberry paper

This "rice paper", smooth, thin, crackly, and strong, is named as a wrapper for rice, and is made from bark fibres of the paper mulberry tree. It is used for origami, calligraphy, paper screens and clothing. It is stronger than commercially made wood-pulp paper. Less commonly, the paper is made from rice straw.

Depending on the type of mulberry used, it is named kozo (Broussonetia papyrifera, the paper mulberry), gampi (Wikstroemia diplomorpha), or mitsumata (Edgeworthia chrysantha). The fiber comes from the bark of the paper mulberry, not the inner wood or pith, and traditionally the paper is made by hand.

The branches of the paper mulberry shrubs are harvested in the autumn, so the fibre can be processed and the paper formed during the cold winter months, because the fibre spoils easily in the heat. The branches are cut into sections two to three feet long and steamed in a large kettle, which makes the bark shrink back from the inner wood, allowing it to be pulled off like a banana peel. The bark can then be dried and stored, or used immediately. There are three layers to the bark at this stage: black bark, the outermost layer; green bark, the middle layer; and white bark, the innermost layer. All three can be made into paper, but the finest paper is made of white bark only.

If the bark strips have been dried, they are soaked in water overnight before being processed further. To clean the black and green bark from the white bark, the bark strip is spread on a board and scraped with a flat knife. Any knots or tough spots in the fibre are cut out and discarded at this stage.

The scraped bark strips are then cooked for two or three hours in a mixture of water and soda ash. The fibre is cooked enough when it can easily be pulled apart lengthwise. The strips are then rinsed several times in clean water to rinse off the soda ash. Rinsing also makes the fibre brighter and whiter—fine kozo paper is not bleached, but is naturally pure white.

Each bark strip is then inspected by hand, against a white background or lit from behind by a light box. Any tiny pieces of black bark and other debris are removed with tweezers, and any knots or tough patches of fibre missed during scraping are cut out of the strips. The ultimate goal is to have completely pure white bark.

The scraped, cooked, and cleaned strips are then laid out on a table and beaten by hand. The beating tool is a wooden bat that looks like a thicker version of a cricket bat. The fibres are beaten for about half an hour, or until all the fibres have been separated and no longer resemble strips of bark.

The prepared fibre can now be made into sheets of paper. A viscous substance called formation aid is added to the vat with the fibre and water. Formation aid is polyethylene oxide, and it helps slow the flow of water, which gives the paper-maker more time to form sheets. Sheets are formed with multiple thin layers of fibre, one on top of another.

Vietnamese rice paper

"Rice Paper" is created from the process of creating rice noodles and Pho, one of the specialties from rice of Vietnamese people. Rice paper originates from the southern provinces. The Northern and Central provinces also created many other types of rice paper with different names. Rice paper has many types from traditional rice paper, coconut milk rice paper, coconut rice paper, mango rice paper, pandan leaf rice paper, etc.

Edible rice paper is used for making fresh spring rolls (salad rolls) or fried spring rolls in Vietnamese cuisine, where the rice paper is called bánh tráng or bánh đa nem. Ingredients of the food rice paper include white rice flour, tapioca flour, salt, and water. The tapioca powder makes the rice paper glutinous and smooth. It is usually sold dried in thin, crisp, translucent round sheets that are wrapped in cellophane. The sheets are individually dipped briefly for a few seconds in warm or cool water to soften, then wrapped around savoury or sweet ingredients.

Edible paper is used in the home baking of foods such as macaroons and is often sold separately as colored sheets that are either plain or printed with images, such as bank notes.

In the media
In the pilot episode of the television series Kung Fu, Kwai Chang Caine undergoes training to become a Shaolin priest. One of the challenges he faces is to walk on a long sheet of rice paper without tearing it or leaving any marks of his passage. His successful completion of the test is incorporated into the series' opening title sequence, with the narration, "When you can walk its length and leave no trace, you will have learned."

See also

 Banana paper
 Xuan paper
 Washi

References

Paper
Food ingredients
Rice products